Gregory Edward Abel (born June 1, 1962) is a Canadian businessman, chairman and CEO of Berkshire Hathaway Energy, and vice-chairman of non-insurance operations of Berkshire Hathaway since January 2018.

Early life and education
Gregory Edward Abel was born on June 1, 1962 in Edmonton, Alberta.

During his childhood Abel did odd jobs like distributing flyers and returning bottles to make money. He also worked as a laborer for a forest product company. He did not participate in too many extracurricular activities in school, aside from hockey and football.

He earned a bachelor's degree in accounting from the University of Alberta in 1984, and is an AICPA certified public accountant.

Career
Abel began his career working as a chartered accountant with PricewaterhouseCoopers in their San Francisco office. In 1992, he joined CalEnergy, a geothermal electricity producer. In 1999, CalEnergy acquired MidAmerican Energy, adopting its name, and Berkshire Hathaway acquired a controlling interest later that year. Abel became CEO of MidAmerican in 2008, and the company was renamed Berkshire Hathaway Energy in 2014.

In January 2018, Abel was named Berkshire Hathaway's vice chairman for non-insurance operations and appointed to Berkshire's board of directors.

Abel is also vice chairman of Edison Electric Institute, and a director of Associated Electric & Gas Insurance Services Limited, Kraft Heinz, Nuclear Electric Insurance Limited, the Hockey Canada Foundation, the Mid-Iowa Council Boy Scouts of America, and the American Football Coaches Foundation. He has been on the board of trustees at Duke University and at Drake University.

In May 2021, while speaking with partner Charlie Munger, Warren Buffett confirmed Abel as his future successor as CEO of Berkshire Hathaway. Abel's handling of CalEnergy’s take-over of a British utility in the 1990s is credited to mark the start of this transition.

Net worth
In 2021 according to Forbes Abel's net worth is estimated at $484 million mainly thanks to his 1% stake in Berkshire Hathaway Energy.

In June 2022, he sold his 1% stake in Berkshire Hathaway Energy for $870 millions.

In October 2022, it was announced that Abel purchased 168 shares of Berkshire Class A shares worth approximately $68 million. This equates to an approximate average share purchase price of $404,761.90. Prior to this latest purchase, Abel held five Class A shares, and 2,363 Class B shares, according to previous filings.

Honors
He received a Horatio Alger award in 2018.

References

1962 births
Living people
Businesspeople from Edmonton
University of Alberta alumni
Canadian chief executives
Directors of Berkshire Hathaway
Berkshire Hathaway employees
 Canadian accountants
 Canadian Jews